Basile Bouchon was a textile worker in the silk center in Lyon who invented a way to control a loom with a perforated paper tape in 1725.  The son of an organ maker, Bouchon partially automated the tedious setting up process of the drawloom in which an operator lifted the warp threads using cords.

This development is considered to be the first industrial application of a semi-automated machine.

The cords of the warp were passed through the eyes of horizontal needles arranged to slide in a box. These were either raised or not depending on whether there was not or was a hole in the tape at that point. This was similar to the piano roll developed at the end of the 19th century and may have been inspired by the patterns that were traditionally drawn on squared paper.

Three years later, his assistant Jean-Baptiste Falcon expanded the number of cords that could be handled by arranging the holes in rows and using rectangular cards that were joined together in an endless loop.

Though this eliminated mistakes in the lifting of threads, it still needed an extra operator to control it and the first attempt at automation was made by Jacques Vaucanson in 1745. But it was not until 1805 that the wildly successful Jacquard mechanism was finally produced.

References

Further reading 

Poncelet, Jean-Victor, Travaux de la Commission Française.  L’Exposition Universelle de 1851, vol. 3, part 1 (Machines et outils appliqués aux arts textiles), section 2, pages 348-349 (1857).  [Poncelet's history of the Jacquard loom is the basis for most subsequent accounts.]
Usher, Abbot Payson.  A History of Mechanical Inventions. Revised edition. (Mineola, N.Y.:  Dover Publications, Inc., 1988), pages 289-291.  (Originally published in 1929 by Harvard University Press in Cambridge, Mass.)
Randell, Brian, ed. The Origins of Digital Computers: Selected Papers, 3rd ed. (N.Y., N.Y.:  Springer-Verlag, 1982), page 5.
Eymard, Paul (1863) “Historique du métier Jacquard”  Annales des Sciences physiques et naturelles*, 3rd series, vol. 7, pages 34–56; see especially page 37. (* published in Lyon, France by Barret)
Ballot, Charles.  L’introduction du machinisme dans l’industrie française.  (Lille-Paris:  F. Rieder, 1923), page 339.
Ballot, Charles.  Revue d'histoire de Lyon: Études, Documents, Bibliographie (Lyon, France:  A. Rey et Co., 1913), vol. 2, pages 6–10.
Barlow, Alfred.  The History and Principles of Weaving by Hand and by Power (London, England: Kessinger Publishing, 2007).  See Chapter 11.  (Originally published in 1876 by Sampson Low, Marston, Searle & Rivington in London.)
History of Computers

External links
Photograph of replica of Bouchon loom

18th-century French inventors
Textile workers
Year of birth missing
Year of death missing
Engineers from Lyon